Taxi, Roulotte et Corrida , is a French comedy film from 1958, directed by André Hunebelle, written by Jean Halain, starring Louis de Funès.

Cast 
 Louis de Funès : Maurice Berger, taxi driver 
 Raymond Bussières : Léon, brother
 Annette Poivre : Mathilde, wife of Léon
 Jacques Dufilho : the client of taxi
 Paulette Dubost : Germaine, l'épouse de Maurice
 Guy Bertil : Jacques Berger, the son
 Véra Valmont : Myriam, the flirt
 Jacques Dynam : Pedro, one of the bandits
 Albert Pilette : Gonzalès, one of the bandits
 Sophie Sel : Nicole, the daughter of Léon and Mathilde
 Max Révol : Mr Fred, the leader of the band
 Jacques Bertrand : Carlos, henchman of Fred
 Louis Bugette : Casimir, a neighbour of Maurice
 Roger Demart : the barman

References

External links 
 
 Taxi, Roulotte et Corrida (1958) at the Films de France

1958 films
French comedy films
1950s French-language films
French black-and-white films
Films directed by André Hunebelle
1950s French films